Teide Observatory, IAU code 954, is an astronomical observatory on Mount Teide at , located on Tenerife, Spain. It has been operated by the Instituto de Astrofísica de Canarias since its inauguration in 1964. It became one of the first major international observatories, attracting telescopes from different countries around the world because of the good astronomical seeing conditions. Later, the emphasis for optical telescopes shifted more towards Roque de los Muchachos Observatory on La Palma.

Telescopes

Solar telescopes 

Solar Vacuum Tower Telescope (VTT): 70 cm diameter. Operated by the Kiepenheuer Institute of Solar Physics, Freiburg (Germany). Installed in 1989.
THEMIS Solar Telescope: 90 cm diameter, built 1996, operated by Italy and France. 
GREGOR Solar Telescope: 1.5 m, operated by a German consortium. In operation since May 2012.
A node of the Birmingham Solar Oscillations Network (BiSON), operated by the University of Birmingham, UK.
One of six sites of the GONG network operated by the NSO Integrated Synoptic Program (NISP), United States.

Nocturnal telescopes
 Carlos Sánchez Infrared Telescope (TCS): 152 cm diameter installed by the UK in 1971
 Mons reflecting telescope: 50 cm diameter, operated by the University of Mons (Belgium), built in 1972.
 IAC-80 Telescope: 80 cm IAC telescope, installed in 1991.
 OGS Telescope: 1 m European Space Agency optical ground station for satellite communications, built in 1998.
 STARE Telescope: 10 cm Stellar Astrophysics & Research on Exoplanets. Used by the Trans-Atlantic Exoplanet Survey.
 Bradford Robotic Telescope: 35 cm Telescope for educational use.
 STELLA Telescopes (STELLA I and STELLA II) robotic telescopes: 120 cm STELLA is an abbreviation of STELLar Activity, operated by Leibniz Institute for Astrophysics (AIP) with the collaboration of the IAC, put in operation 2006.
 SLOOH: US robotic telescopes, built in 2004.
SPECULOOS Northern Observatory (SNO): 1-meter telescopes, one telescope (Artemis) completed in June 2019

Radio telescopes for cosmic microwave background astronomy
 The 33 GHz interferometer
 The COSMOSOMAS Experiment (10 and 15 GHz)
 The Very Small Array (VSA: 14-element interferometer at 30 GHz)
 QUIJOTE CMB Experiment
 GroundBIRD

Other buildings on the site
The observatory has a visitors' centre and a residencia (hostel) for astronomers. Brian May helped construct a building there to study interplanetary dust.

List of discovered minor planets 

The Minor Planet Center credits the discovery of several minor planets directly to the observatory.

Discovery of the first brown dwarf star

In 1995, Rafael Rebolo López, María Rosa Zapatero-Osorio  and  Eduardo L. Martín published their discovery of Teide-1, which they found through optical observations using the 0.8 meter telescope at Teide Observatory.

Climate
The position where the observatory is situated has a mediterranean climate (Köppen Csb), with average temperature features reminiscent of southern England. Extremes are moderated by its marine features, which combined with the altitude keeps temperatures below  even during heat waves, and in spite of the altitude the marine features are strong enough to prevent severe frosts. Sunshine levels, as typical of the nearby lowland arid climates, are high throughout the year. Many alpine areas at further distance from the equator are above the tree line at this elevation, but Teide is far above even any subarctic temperatures due to its position on the 28th parallel north.

Astroclimate and seeing
The useful observing time is given as 78% and the median FWHM seeing from DIMM measurements is given as 0.76" and 0.70" at two sites near the Carlos Sánchez Telescope.

See also 

 Astronomical seeing
 Cerro Tololo Inter-American Observatory
 European Extremely Large Telescope
 Instituto de Astrofísica de Canarias
 La Silla Observatory
 Llano de Chajnantor Observatory
 
 Mount Teide
 Paranal Observatory
 Pico Viejo
 Roque de los Muchachos Observatory
 Teide National Park
 Very Large Telescope

References

External links 

 Observatorio del Teide website
 Discover the Teide Observatory at worldflicks.org

Astronomical observatories in the Canary Islands
Buildings and structures in Tenerife
Minor-planet discovering observatories